Sant'Ambrogio is a Roman Catholic church located in the neighborhood of Albogasio Superiore, in the territory of the commune of Valsolda, Province of Como, region of Lombardy, Italy.

The church was erected in the 15th century, but was refurbished in circa 1500. The interior was frescoed in 1680 with the Life of Saint Ambrose by Stefano Vignola.

References

16th-century Roman Catholic church buildings in Italy
Churches in the province of Como